Aubrey Vincent Reeve (19 September 1911 – 17 July 1996) was a British long-distance runner. He competed in the men's 5000 metres at the 1936 Summer Olympics.

References

1911 births
1996 deaths
Athletes (track and field) at the 1934 British Empire Games
Athletes (track and field) at the 1936 Summer Olympics
British male long-distance runners
Olympic athletes of Great Britain
Place of birth missing